Wat Suwannaram Ratchaworawihan or usually shortened to Wat Suwannaram and Wat Suwan (วัดสุวรรณาราม, วัดสุวรรณ; RTGS: Wat Suwan Naram, Wat Suwan) is an historic second-class royal temple in Bangkok located in Soi Charan Sanit Wong 32, Charan Sanit Wong Road, Siri Rat Subdistrict, Bangkok Noi District, Thonburi side, on the western bank of Khlong Bangkok Noi.

History
The temple dates back to the Ayutthaya period, when it was known as "Wat Thong" (วัดทอง; lit: golden monastery) without apparent evidence of the builder. Later on, in the era of King Taksin of Thonburi Kingdom, it was used as the execution ground for Burmese prisoners of war similar to Wat Khok (now Wat Phlapphla Chai) in today's Phlapphla Chai area. King Phutthayotfa Chulalok (Rama I) bestowed the name Wat Suwannaram, indicating royal patronage. Until the reign of King Chulalongkorn (Rama V) the grounds of Wat Suwannaram were also used as the Royal Cremation site for members of the Royal Family and top ranking officials of the Kingdom.

King Nangklao (Rama III), restored the temple and sponsored the painting of murals in the ordination hall by two famous artists named Luang Wichijesda or Kru Thong Yu and Chinese Luang Seniborirak or Kru Kong Pae. They competed with each other during the painting using a veil so their unfinished artwork could not be seen. The murals are painted in traditional Thai-style depicting stories of Prince Nemi and Prince Mahosadha from the Mahanipata Jataka. The murals of this temple are considered masterpiece paintings of the Rattanakosin era with 80 percent preserved. The architecture of the ordination hall is also of interest, the building being curved like a Chinese junk in the style of late Ayutthaya period.

Around Wat Suwannaram there are still traditional communities with a long history such as Ban Bu, the last community of bronzework handicraft makers in Bangkok, Wat Thong Market, the local flea market for more than 100 years, an old traditional Thai medicine pharmacy, Bangkok Noi Museum, Wat Suwannaram School, and nearby the historic railway station Bangkok Noi Railway Station.

Principal Buddha image
The temple's principal Buddha image known as "Phra Satsada" (พระศาสดา; "prophet Buddha") is believed to be a very sacred Buddha image. There are many people who come to make vows each day. To make vows people bring a loincloth to tie around the waist and run around the ordination hall three times along with making the sound like a horse; this is called "running the horse".

Ghost stories
Because it used to be an execution ground the temple is rumored to be a haunted place. There is a standing spirit house for the Burmese soldier spirits on the playground of the current school of Wat Suwannaram. There are people claiming to have seen preta on the bell tower, including the male headless ghost with red chong kraben, and one of security guards claims to have seen a woman ghost at the pier about 2:00 a.m.

References

External links

Buddhist temples in Bangkok
Tourist attractions in Bangkok
Bangkok Noi district
Thai Theravada Buddhist temples and monasteries
Registered ancient monuments in Bangkok